Fern is an unincorporated community located in the thirty-second section of Beaver Township, Grundy County, Iowa. As of February 2022 it has 14 inhabited houses.

Location
Fern lies on the junction of 150th Street and N Avenue of Iowa Highway 14, 6.1 miles (9.8 kilometers) northeast of Holland, Iowa, the location of its postal code. It goes under the postal code 50642.

Businesses
Fern has a feed store, Fern Feed & Seed, and a concrete grinding company, West Fork Grinding.

History
Fern had a post office that opened under the name of Andersonville on June 22, 1892, until it was discontinued on December 31, 1907. The name was changed from Andersonville to Fern on March 20, 1894. A creamery was built at Fern c. 1911, and is no longer in use. Fern's population was 25 in 1902, and 50 in 1925.

See also
List of unincorporated communities in Iowa

References 

Unincorporated communities in Iowa
Unincorporated communities in Grundy County, Iowa
1892 establishments in Iowa
1907 disestablishments in Iowa
Populated places established in 1892
Populated places disestablished in 1907